Robert Thomas McMillan (1887–1962) of Irwell, Canterbury was appointed a member of the New Zealand Legislative Council on 22 June 1950.

He was appointed as a member of the suicide squad nominated by the First National Government in 1950 to vote for the abolition of the Council. Most of the new members (like McMillan) were appointed on 22 June 1950, and served until 31 December 1950 when the Council was abolished.

References

1887 births
1962 deaths
Members of the New Zealand Legislative Council
New Zealand National Party MLCs